Jeremy Morin (born April 16, 1991) is an American former professional ice hockey left winger. Morin played major junior hockey for the Kitchener Rangers of the Ontario Hockey League (OHL), the team he was drafted from in the second round, 45th overall, in 2009 by the National Hockey League (NHL)'s Atlanta Thrashers. Morin was later traded to Chicago, then the Columbus Blue Jackets, followed by a return trade to Chicago during the 2015 off-season. Morin was traded to the Toronto Maple Leafs a few months later, and would spend some time within their organization before a trade sent him to the San Jose Sharks.

Prior to playing in the OHL, Morin played for the USA Hockey National Team Development Program (NTDP) for two years, competing in the North American Hockey League (NAHL). Internationally, at the junior level, he has represented the United States on four occasions, medaling in each junior tournament.

Playing career
As a youth, Morin played in the 2003 Quebec International Pee-Wee Hockey Tournament with a minor ice hockey team from Syracuse, New York.

Amateur career
Morin began his playing career in 2006–07 as a member of the Syracuse Stars in the Eastern Junior Hockey League (EJHL), being named EJHL Rookie of the Year. The following season, Morin joined the United States National Team Developmental Program (NTDP). He played two seasons with the NTDP, leading the team in scoring with 33 goals and 59 points and tied for first with five game-winning goals in 55 games. At the end of the 2008–09 season, Morin was selected in the second round, 45th overall, in the 2009 NHL Entry Draft by the Atlanta Thrashers.

After playing for the NTDP, Morin joined the Kitchener Rangers of the Ontario Hockey League (OHL), where he scored 83 points in 58 regular season games in 2009–10. He was named the Canadian Hockey League (CHL)'s Player of the Week for the fifth week of the 2010 playoffs after registering six goals and one assist in four games, highlighted by two hat-tricks.

Professional
On June 1, 2010, Morin signed an entry-level contract with Atlanta. Twenty-three days later, he was traded to the Chicago Blackhawks as part of a deal that sent first- (24th overall) and second-round picks (both previously belonging to the New Jersey Devils) in the 2010 NHL Entry Draft (as well as Marty Reasoner and Joey Crabb) to Chicago in exchange for Dustin Byfuglien, Brent Sopel, Ben Eager and Akim Aliu.

Prior to the 2010–11 season, Morin had a strong training camp and made an impression on Blackhawks head coach Joel Quenneville, while tying for second on the team in pre-season scoring with four points. However, the Blackhawks assigned Morin to their American Hockey League (AHL) affiliate, the Rockford IceHogs, to begin the year. After playing eight games with Rockford, leading the team in power play goals with three, Morin was recalled from the AHL on November 5, 2010. He made his NHL debut the next day at Philips Arena against the team that originally drafted him, Atlanta. His first stint with the Blackhawks lasted two games, where he registered four shots on goal and two blocked shots; he reassigned to Rockford after three days with Chicago. Following an injury to Marián Hossa, Morin was recalled as his replacement on November 30. At the time of his second call-up, Morin was leading the IceHogs in goals, with six, and was tied for third on the team with nine points. Later that day, in a game against the St. Louis Blues, Morin registered his first NHL point, a power play assist, and registered his first NHL fight in a bout with the Blues' Chris Porter. He played in the Blackhawks next two games, but six days later was again assigned to Rockford. However, the move was believed to be an attempt at saving money against the team's salary cap. As anticipated, the Blackhawks recalled Morin prior to their next game against the Dallas Stars while placing Hossa on injured reserve. During the game, on December 8, Morin scored his first NHL goal, beating Andrew Raycroft 1:36 into the second period of a 5–3 Blackhawks victory. However, the Blackhawks' cap concerns remained, and Morin was again reassigned to Rockford the following day. He continued to bounce back and forth between Rockford and Chicago but with the return of Hossa and Viktor Stålberg from injury, Morin was not needed in the Blackhawks line-up and was subsequently loaned to Team USA for the 2011 World Junior Championships. Following the tournament, Morin returned to Rockford, but in mid-January, Morin suffered what was believed to be a concussion and missed the remainder of the season. He finished his first professional season playing in 31 games scoring ten goals and 15 points between the NHL and AHL.

Morin was unable to return to the ice until the start of training camp, but was still unable to participate in pre-season games. Assigned to Rockford, he missed the first two games of the 2011–12 season. He played in 22 games for the IceHogs, registering 15 points, before he was recalled by the Blackhawks for the team's December 18 game with the Calgary Flames. In the game, Morin spent some time on the Blackhawks' top line alongside Jonathan Toews and Patrick Kane, but went pointless in 10:23 of ice time.

On June 27, 2014, the Blackhawks signed Morin to a two-year contract extension. During the 2014–15 season, on December 14, Morin was traded to the Columbus Blue Jackets in exchange for defenseman Tim Erixon.

On June 30, 2015, Morin was reacquired by the Blackhawks (alongside Marko Daňo, Artem Anisimov, Corey Tropp and a fourth-round draft pick in 2016) in a multi-player deal that sent Brandon Saad, Alex Broadhurst and Michael Paliotta to Columbus. In the 2015–16 season, Morin was familiarly returned to Chicago's AHL affiliate, the IceHogs. In 28 games, he contributed to the IceHogs with 22 points before on January 3, 2016, he was traded to the Toronto Maple Leafs in exchange for right winger Richard Pánik. Morin was directly assigned to the AHL's Toronto Marlies and appeared in just 13 games before he was again included in a trade (alongside James Reimer) to the San Jose Sharks in exchange for Alex Stalock, Ben Smith and a conditional fourth-round pick in 2018 on February 27, 2016. Morin completed the season playing in 18 games for 14 points with the Sharks' AHL affiliate, the San Jose Barracuda.

On July 1, 2016, as a free agent, Morin left the Sharks to sign a one-year, two-way contract with the Tampa Bay Lightning. He was assigned to Tampa's AHL affiliate, the Syracuse Crunch, to begin the 2016–17 season. On February 25, 2017, Morin was traded to the Arizona Coyotes in exchange for Stefan Fournier.

Familiarly a free agent at seasons end, Morin signed his first contract abroad in agreeing to a one-year contract with HC Yugra of the Kontinental Hockey League (KHL). In the 2017–18 season, Morin featured in just three scoreless games before mutually opting to terminate his contract with Yugra on September 21, 2017. He returned to North America and agreed to play in the ECHL, signing a one-year deal with the South Carolina Stingrays on October 13, 2017.

On December 2, 2017, Morin signed a one-month contract with SC Bern of the Swiss National League as a replacement for injured Mika Pyörälä. Morin eventually appeared in one NL game with Bern, failing to score a point, before being released on January 3, 2018. Morin continued his whirlwind year by signing a one-year contract with the Swiss League's SC Rapperswil-Jona Lakers on January 9, 2018.

After helping the Lakers return to the top-flight National League, Morin left as a free agent to return to North America. He was later announced to have secured an AHL professional try-out contract with the AHL's Hershey Bears, making the opening night roster for the 2018–19 season. He appeared in three scoreless games with the Bears before he was released from his professional try-out contract on October 30, 2018.

International play

Morin made his international debut in 2008 representing the United States at the IIHF World U18 Championships. In his first international tournament, he scored a team-leading six goals in seven contests. the United States defeated Sweden 6–3 in the Bronze medal game earning Morin his first international medal. Morin finished the tournament eighth overall in scoring with eight points. The following year, he again represented the United States at the 2009 IIHF World U18 Championships. Team USA defeated Russia in the final, 5–0, winning the gold medal. Morin lead the team in goal scoring, with seven and tied for second in points, with ten, his ten points ranked him tenth in tournament scoring. Morin also represented the United States at the 2010 World Junior Championships, where he registered five assists and seven points in seven games. In the tournament final, the U.S. defeated Canada 6–5 in overtime, winning gold. After being loaned from the Blackhawks so he could participate in the 2011 World Junior Championships, Morin was named an alternate captain for Team USA. During the team's first game, a 3–2 overtime win against Finland, Morin suffered what was thought to be a significant shoulder injury. However, he returned to the American lineup after missing only one game. In the tournament quarterfinals, the U.S. lost to Canada, 4–1. They rebounded in the bronze medal game defeating Sweden 4–2. The victory marked the first time Team USA won medals in back-to-back tournaments, and the first medal they won on home soil. During the tournament, Morin registered one assist through four games.

Playing style
Morin was known as a goal-scorer in juniors. He has the ability to shoot from anywhere and find open space to shoot, often going to the front of the net and finding space to score. He possesses a quick release that accompanies a solid shot. Morin is considered a gritty player for a goal scorer; he plays hard and has a bit of an edge in his game. He plays a solid all-round game, possesses a high hockey IQ, and competes every shift.

Personal
Morin's cousin, J. D. Forrest, plays professionally in Finland, while his older brother Chad was also a member of the NTDP and went on to play for Harvard University in the ECAC. Morin also had an uncle who played college hockey.

Career statistics

Regular season and playoffs

International

All statistics taken from NHL.com

References

External links

1991 births
Living people
American men's ice hockey left wingers
Atlanta Thrashers draft picks
Auburn High School (Auburn, New York) alumni
SC Bern players
Chicago Blackhawks players
Columbus Blue Jackets players
Hershey Bears players
HPK players
Ice hockey players from New York (state)
Kitchener Rangers players
Sportspeople from Auburn, New York
SC Rapperswil-Jona Lakers players
Rockford IceHogs (AHL) players
San Jose Barracuda players
South Carolina Stingrays players
Syracuse Crunch players
Toronto Marlies players
Tucson Roadrunners players
USA Hockey National Team Development Program players
HC Yugra players